The 1919 Boston College football team represented Boston College an independent during the 1919 college football season. Led by first-year head coach Frank Cavanaugh, Boston College compiled a record of 5–3.

Schedule

References

Boston College
Boston College Eagles football seasons
Boston College football
1910s in Boston